Juan Carlos Portillo Leal (born 31 December 1991) is a Salvadoran professional footballer who plays as a forward for Primera División club Alianza.

He made his El Salvador national football team debut on 1 June 2016 in a friendly against Armenia, as a starter.
He was selected for the country's 2019 CONCACAF Gold Cup squad.

International goals 
Scores and results list El Salvador's goal tally first.

References

External links
 
 

1991 births
People from Sonsonate Department
Living people
Salvadoran footballers
El Salvador international footballers
Association football midfielders
C.D. Juventud Independiente players
Alianza F.C. footballers
2019 CONCACAF Gold Cup players
Primera División de Fútbol Profesional players
2021 CONCACAF Gold Cup players